and , born August 11 in Kōchi Prefecture, are two Japanese manga artists and character designers, twin sisters, who work together under the pseudonym of . They are best known for the manga versions of the Pretty Cure franchise.

Biography 
The Kamikita twins started drawing at a young age, influenced by their mother, passionate about painting. Later on, they attended the University of Tokyo.

As animators and designers in Hiroshi Sasagawa's studio, in 1989 they won the Shueisha Akatsuka Award with RED HOT, published in the special winter issue of Shōnen Jump. From 2002 to 2004, they drew the paper version of Akubi Girl, and then they started adapting Pretty Cure, serialized in Nakayoshi, of which they also realized short sticker stories throughout the years. In 2006, the Kamikita twins participated in designing the monsters of Yu-Gi-Oh! In January 2008, the joined the staff of the remake of Yatterman as character designers.

In 2011 they joined the planning of the collectible card game Cardfight!! Vanguard. In the second half of 2012, they illustrated three storybooks for children: Cinderella, Snow White and The Little Mermaid.

Works

Manga 
 RED HOT – short story, 1989
  – short story, 1995
  – 1995–1996
  – 2002-2004
  – single volume, 2004–2005
  – 2005–2006
  – single volume, 2005
  – single volume, 2005
  – 2 volumes, 2006–2007
  – single volume, 2006
  – 2006
  – 2007–2008
  – 2008–2009
  – 2 volumes, 2009–2010
  – 2 volumes, 2010–2011
  – 2 volumes, 2011–2012
  – 2012–2013
  – 2013–2014
  – 2014–2015
  – 2015–2016
  – 2016–2017
  – 2017–2018
  – 2018–2019
  – 2019
  - 2020-2021
  - 2021-2022
  - 2022–present

Illustrated books

Character design 
 Time Bokan
 Yattodetaman (1981)
 Gyakuten! Ippatsuman (1982–1983)
 Itadakiman (1983)
 Time Bokan 2000: Kaitou Kiramekiman (2000)
 Yatterman (2008)
 Yoroshiku Mechadock (1984–1985)
 Akubi Girl (2001)
 Yu-Gi-Oh! GX (2004-2008)
 Ippatsuhitchū!! Devander (2012)

References

External links 
  Profile at the official website of Ryuichi Yokoyama Memorial Manga Museum, Kōchi
  Works resume at Tails-room.com

Living people
Manga artists from Kōchi Prefecture
University of Tokyo alumni
Japanese twins
Year of birth missing (living people)